Shihāb al-Dīn Abu ’l-Abbās Aḥmad ibn Abi ’l-ʿAlāʾ Idrīs ibn ʿAbd al-Raḥmān ibn ʿAbd Allāh ibn Yallīn al-Ṣanhājī al-Ṣaʿīdī al-Bahfashīmī al-Būshī al-Bahnasī al-Miṣrī al-Mālikī (also known as simply known as Shihāb al-Dīn al-Qarāfī or al-Qarāfī, 1228–1285), was a Maliki jurist and legal theoretician of Sanhaja Berber origin who lived in Ayyubid and Mamluk Egypt.

Biography 
He was born in Bahfashīm, a village in the province of Bahnasa in 1228. This village belonged to the district of Būsh, a town just a few miles to the north of Beni Suef. He apparently grew up in al-Qarafa in Old Cairo, whence his sobriquet of al-Qarafi. He was of Berber origin, from the Sanhaja tribe.

He is considered by many to be the greatest Maliki legal theoretician of the 13th century; his writings and influence on Islamic legal theory (uṣūl al-fiqh) spread throughout the Muslim world. His insistence on the limits of law underscores the importance of non-legal (not to be confused with illegal) considerations in determining the proper course of action, with significant implications for legal reform in the modern Islamic world. His views on the common good (maslahah) and custom provide means to accommodate the space-time differential between modern and premodern realities.

Works 
The most important of his many works are Al-dhakhirah (The Stored Treasure), Al-furuq (Differences), Nafais al usul (Gems of Legal Theory), and Kitab al-ihkam fi tamyiz al-fatawa an al-ahkam wa tasarrufat al-qadi wal-imam (The Book of Perfecting the Distinction Between Legal Opinions, Judicial Decisions, and the Discretionary Actions of the Judge and the Caliph).

His work Al-dhakhirah is one of the most important works in the Maliki madhhab, spanning several volumes, where the imam explains fiqh with evidences from usul al-fiqh in detail and has a strong personality in the way he presents the school.

See also

 List of Ash'aris and Maturidis
 List of Muslim theologians

References

Bibliography
Aydin M. Sayili, "Al Qarafi and His Explanation of the Rainbow," Isis, Vol. 32 (Jul. 1940): 16-26.
Diego R. Sarrió Cucarella, Muslim-Christian Polemics Across the Mediterranean: The Splendid Replies of  Shihāb al-Dīn al-Qarāfī (d. 684/1285). Leiden-Boston: Brill, 2015. 
Diego R. Sarrió Cucarella, “Se battre pour la cause de Dieu : vice ou vertu ? Vues de Shihāb al-Dīn al-Qarāfī (d. 1285)”, Islamochristiana 41 (2015): 95-107.
Sherman A. Jackson, Islamic Law and the State: The Constitutional Jurisprudence of Shihāb al-Dīn al-Qarāfī, Leiden: Brill, 1996.

1228 births
1285 deaths
13th-century Berber people
Asharis
Berber Egyptians
Berber scholars
Egyptian Maliki scholars
Sanhaja
13th-century Muslim scholars of Islam
13th-century jurists
Critics of Christianity